Swift Leisure are a British manufacturer of leisure vehicles, including caravans and motorhomes. Started in 1964, the company is based in Cottingham, East Riding of Yorkshire.

It celebrated its Golden 50th year in 2014, with the launch of SMART HT, the first fully composite caravan without any timber and ply in the body, and using a patent pending aluminum jointing systems and a patent pending floor construction .

History
Swift was founded in 1964 by Ken Smith.  The company started with the single Swift brand of caravans, based on a distinctive tri-front window design (all of which opened - unique at the time), which also allowed easy see through to the rear for the driver whilst travelling.

Following the break-up of the travelling caravan business of Cosalt plc, in 1994 the company acquired the Cosalt brand of  Abbey, followed in 1994 with the purchase of Sprite leisure and the Ace brand in 2001. Since late 2008 Swift Leisure has dropped the Abbey and Ace brands of touring caravans. Within the Swift International division, the company has operations in Denmark, the Netherlands and New Zealand.

The company moved manufacturing from Hedon Road, Kingston upon Hull to Dunswell Lane, near Cottingham in 1970. In the early 2000s the company moved to an adjacent site in Cottingham to allow expanded production facilities.

Timeline
Key events in the companies history:
1964 Swift Caravans founded
1986 Swift Motorhomes launched, with the Kon-Tiki motorhome, named for Thor Heyerdahl's expedition.
1992 Abbey Caravans purchased
1994 Sprite Leisure purchased
1995 Sprite Leisure renamed Sterling
1996 Bessacarr Caravans purchased
1997 Bessacarr Motorhomes launched
2001 Ace Caravans purchased
2001 Ace Motorhomes launched
2004 Swift Holiday Homes launched
2004 Sprite Caravans relaunched
2008 Autocruise purchased

Group brands
Abbey
Caravans (until 2008)
Ace
Caravans (until 2008)
Motorhomes (until 2008)
Autocruise (purchased in 2007)
Motorhomes
Bessacar
Caravans (until 2006)
Motorhomes
Escape
Motorhomes
Mondial
Motorhomes
Sprite
Caravans
Sterling
Caravans
Swift
Caravans
Motorhomes

References

External links
 
 Official Swift Owners Club UK website
 Sprite Sterling Swift Caravan Owners Club website

Recreational vehicle manufacturers
Manufacturing companies of England
Companies based in the East Riding of Yorkshire
Cottingham, East Riding of Yorkshire
British companies established in 1965
Vehicle manufacturing companies established in 1965
Caravan and travel trailer manufacturers